Frank Marion is a former professional American football player who played linebacker for seven seasons for the New York Giants.

References

1951 births
American football linebackers
New York Giants players
Florida A&M Rattlers football players
Living people
Players of American football from Florida